Surkh Kotal ( Chashma-i Shir; also called Sar-i Chashma, is an ancient archaeological site located in the southern part of the region of Bactria, about  north of the city of Puli Khumri, the capital of Baghlan Province of Afghanistan. It is the location of monumental constructions made during the rule of the Kushans. Huge temples, statues of Kushan rulers and the Surkh Kotal inscription, which revealed part of the chronology of early Kushan emperors (also called Great Gara) were all found there. The Rabatak inscription which gives remarkable clues on the genealogy of the Kushan dynasty was also found in the Robatak village just outside the site.

The site of Surkh Kotal, excavated between 1952 and 1966 by Prof. Schlumberger of the Délégation Archéologique Française en Afghanistan, is the main site excavated of the Kushan Empire. Some of the site's sculptures were transferred to the National Museum of Afghanistan (also known as the 'Kabul Museum'), the rest of the site was completely looted during the Afghan Civil War. The most famous artifacts of this site are the Surkh Kotal inscriptions, the statue of King Kanishka and the fire altar. The statue of the king was destroyed during the Taliban wave of iconoclasm in February–March 2001, but has been restored by French conservationists. The three artifacts are currently on display in the Afghan National Museum.

The ancient name of the site

The current, well-established name for the site was given to it by the French team of archaeologists headed by M. Schlumberger that originally surveyed the remains. This is not its ancient name, but is instead the modern name for the hills upon which it sits.

An ancient name for the site has been put forward by W. B. Henning and J. D. M. Derrett based on a word in fragments of text found in situ that reads "ΒΑΓΟΛΑΓΓΟ" - "BAGOLANGO" - which would fit with the current name for the nearby city and its region, Baghlan. Though the script of the text is Greek, the language is unknown, so it is not known with certainty whether this word is in fact the name of the site or merely another word for something else. They propose that this language is likely to be the local Iranian dialect, and compare the word with the Old Iranian baga-danaka, meaning "temple/sanctuary".

The inscriptions
Here are translations of the inscriptions from Surkh Kotal by J. Harmatta. They were originally in the Bactrian language and written in Greek script. For possible interpretations of their meanings, see Harmatta's article.:

Inscription SK2
The "unfinished inscription" (SK2) has been translated as:

"Era-year 299, on the 9th [day] of [month] Dios, King of Kings Ooëmo Takpiso, the majesty, the Kuṣāṇa, had the canal d[ug here]."

Unfortunately, the fragments of an inscription from the period of Kanishka's reign contain only about one fifth (124 letters altogether) of the original inscription. They have been translated as:

the lord, K[ing of Kings], the mighty Kaneṣko . . .]

[in the] first [era ye]ar T [an officer of the king] c[ame] here.

Then [this stronghold and the sanctuary] were built by him in four years.

[And] when the st[rongho]ld was com[pleted, then this fa]çade [and] the stairs l[eading th]ere [were built by him. Moreover, the canal was wh]olly bu[tressed with stones so that p[ure water was [provid]ed [by him in the can]al for the ab[ode of the gods. Thus he] to[ook care of the sanctuary].

[Moreover, this stronghold and the canal were built by So-and-So by the order of the king]. Then So-and-So inscribed this façade and the stairs leading there.

The "Surkh Kotal inscription" (SK4)
The text of SK 4 (A, B, M) runs:

This stronghold is the 'Kaneṣko' Oanindo sanctuary which the lord king made the namebearer of Kaneṣko.

At that time when the stronghold was first completed, then its inner water to drink was missing, therefore the stronghold was without water. And when the water-flow disappeared from the canal, then the gods wished themselves away from the abode. Then they were led to Lrafo, [namely] to Andēzo. Afterwards the stronghold became abandoned.

Then, when Nokonzoko, the karalrango, the king's favourite who is much devoted towards the king, Son of God, the patron, the benefactor, the merciful as well, who wishes glory, all-winning strength from pure hearrt, came here to the sanctuary in the 31st Era-year, in the month Nīsān, then he took care of the stronghold. Then he had a well dug, thus he provided water. Thereafter he buttressed [the well] with stones so that the fine, pure water should not be missing for the stronghold. And when for them the water-flow would disappear from the canal, even then the gods, should not wish themselves away from their abode, thus the stronghold should not become abandoned for them.

Moreover, he appointed an inspector over the well, he placed a helper there, so that a separate [inspector] took good care of the well and a separate inspecto of the whole stronghold.

Moreover, this well and the façade were made by Xirgomano, the karalrango, by the order of the king. [B: Moreover, this well was made by Borzomioro, son of Kozgaṣko, citizen of Hastilogan, attendant of Nokonziko, the karalrango, by order of the king.]

Moreover, Eiiomano inscribed [this] together with Mihramano, the son of Bozomihro [Device 5] jointly [Device 2]. (A: Device 1 jointly, Device 2, B: Liiago, Device 3, Adego, Device 4).

Architectural elements

See also

 
Mundigak — archaeological site in Kandahar Province
Hadda — archaeological site in Nangarhar Province
Mes Aynak — archaeological site in Logar Province
Takht-i-Bahi — archaeological site in Mardan
Mehrgarh — archaeological site in Bolan
Sheri Khan Tarakai — archaeological site in Bannu
Rabatak inscription

Footnotes

References
M. Le Berre, and G. Fussman, Surkh Kotal en Bactriane I. Les temples, MDAFA 25, Paris, 1983.
 Henning (1956): “Notes and Communications. ‘Surkh Kotal’." Bulletin of the School of Oriental and African Studies, University of London, Vol. 18, No. 2 (1956), pp. 366–367.
 Vogelsang, Willem. 2002. The Afghans, pp. 148–150. Blackwell Publishers. Oxford. .

External links
 Dupree, Nancy Hatch (1977): An Historical Guide to Afghanistan. 1st Edition: 1970. 2nd Edition. Revised and Enlarged. Afghan Tourist Organization. 
 For recent photographs please see http://www.spach.info/ephotosbaghlan.htm
 Surkh Kotal inscription and statue of Kanishka at Kabul Museum

Archaeological sites in Afghanistan
Kushan Empire
Former populated places in Afghanistan
Sites along the Silk Road